Iopu Iopu-Aso (born 1 April 1991) is a New Zealand rugby union player who currently plays as a loose forward for  in the ITM Cup and the  in Super Rugby.

Career

Born in Auckland to Samoan parents, Iopu-Aso had to leave his home province due to a lack of opportunities and decided to set up home in New Plymouth.   He worked part-time putting up marquees and also as a truck driver while he played locally for Spotswood United.   He made the Taranaki Development squad in 2013 and was subsequently promoted to the ITM Cup side for 2014.   He made an instant impact during a highly impressive campaign for Taranaki and as a reward he was named in the Hurricanes squad for the 2015 Super Rugby season.

International career

Iopu-Aso was a New Zealand sevens representative in 2012

References

1991 births
New Zealand rugby union players
New Zealand sportspeople of Samoan descent
Taranaki rugby union players
Male rugby sevens players
Rugby union flankers
Rugby union number eights
People educated at Mount Albert Grammar School
Rugby union players from Auckland
Living people